August Gottlieb Meissner (3 November 1753 – 18 February 1807) was a German writer of the Enlightenment and is considered the founder of the German detective story.

Life
Meissner was born in Bautzen.  His father (died 1761) was a government quartermaster. From 1764 to 1772 he attended the school in Löbau and graduated in law at the University of Wittenberg on 18 September 1772. In 1774 he moved to the University of Leipzig, where he finished his studies in 1776. During his studies he developed a passion for the theater and poetry. At the urging of his mother he went to Dresden, where he joined the Federation of Free Masons. After a journey through Austria in 1785 he was offered the position of professor of aesthetics and classical literature at the University of Prague. In 1805 he went to Fulda to take up the position of director of the school, which he retained until his death. He died in Fulda, aged 53.

Meissner's 1783 marriage to Johanna Becker produced several children. His daughter Bianca married, as her second husband, the German art historian and art patron Johann Gottlob von Quandt. The poet Alfred Meissner was his grandson.

Literary work and importance
Meissner's literary debut was in 1776 with the text of the comic opera Das Grab des Mufti oder die zwei Geizigen  (The grave of the Mufti, or the two misers), which premiered in Leipzig on 17 January 1779.

Meissner's significance for German literature is his role in developing the new genre of the detective story. There had been representations of crime in the form of sensational journalism and collections of legal cases, which were sometimes very popular, but Meissner's separation of legal and moral accountability of a crime made his tales of true crime the best-sellers of his time. Meissner shifted the focus of his stories from the criminal offense and its punishment to the psychological and social sources of the crime. The reader is acquainted with the offender before the criminal act occurs, they get to know the circumstances and motives of the crime and join the criminal in court.

Meissner's narrative tradition was continued by Schiller, in his Crimes of Lost Honor, and in the works of Kleist. The detective story flowered in Germany in the 19th century. The genre is also known as Meissner's contribution to the Enlightenment, as his works caused a "humanization" of the law by incorporating social and psychological origins of crime. By 1800, psychological reports were accepted as relevant and were also cited in legal judgments.

Meissner wrote many fables. One of the best known is Sonne und Wind (The Sun and the Wind) which is often mistakenly attributed to Johann Gottfried von Herder. He also undertook translations from English, such as Der Unsichtbare Kundschafter, a translation of Eliza Haywood's The Invisible Spy.

Detective stories
Meissner published more than 50 detective stories, which were very successful. The titles of some of these stories are:

"Mord aus Schwärmerey"
"Unkeusche, Mörderin, Mordbrennerin, und doch blos ein unglückliches Mädchen"
"Blutschänder, Feuerleger und Mörder zugleich, den Gesetzen nach, und doch ein Jüngling von edler Seele"
"Mörder seiner Verlobten und Räuber! dann eine Zeitlang redlicher Mann; seltsam entdeckt, noch seltsamer sich selbst angebend"

References 
 August Gottlieb Meißner: Ausgewählte Kriminalgeschichten. Mit einem Nachwort hg. v. Alexander Košenina, Röhrig Universitätsverlag, St. Ingbert, 2004
 Karl Heinrich Jördens: Lexikon deutscher Dichter und Prosaisten. Weidmannische Buchhandlung, Leipzig, 1808, Bd. 3, S. 473 (Online)
 Arnošt Kraus: August Gottlieb Meissner. In: Athenaeum. Listy pro literaturu a kritiku vědeckou. V, 5 (15. Februar 888), 125–135, 153–163
 Rudolf Fürst: August Gottlieb Meissner: Eine Darstellung seines Lebens und seiner Schriften, mit Quellenuntersuchungen. Verlag B. Behr, Berlin, 1894 u. 1900

External links

 
Review: August Gottlieb Meißner (in German)
Meißner - selected crime stories (in German)

1753 births
1807 deaths
19th-century German people
German crime fiction writers
German male dramatists and playwrights
18th-century German dramatists and playwrights
18th-century German male writers